Starokuyanovo (İśke Quyan) is a rural locality (a selo) in Bakalinsky Selsoviet, Bakalinsky District, Bashkortostan, Russia. The population was 379 as of 2010. There are 4 streets.

Geography 
Starokuyanovo is located 11 km southeast of Bakaly (the district's administrative centre) by road. Tokberdino is the nearest rural locality.

References 

Rural localities in Bakalinsky District